Raymond Forchion is an American actor, writer, producer, and director who has appeared in film, television and stage. Aside from several pilots and TV movies, he has co-starred on such series as Burn Notice, Numb3rs, Star Trek: The Next Generation, Femme Fatales, Southland,
Will & Grace, The Golden Girls, Wiseguy and In the Heat of the Night. He's had recurring roles on General Hospital and Miami Vice. Films include the original, Flight Of The Navigator, Point Break and Master Blaster.

Directors and actors he has worked with include: Ron Howard, Katherine Bigelow, Randal Kleiser, Burt Reynolds, Johnny Depp, Joshua Logan, Curtis Hanson, Keanu Reeves, Franco Zeffirelli, Cliff Robertson, James Burrows, Joe Roth, Tobe Hooper, Jay Roach, Robert Ellis Miller and others. He has starred in nearly 100 commercials. In addition to playing O. J. Simpson in the award-winning CBS miniseries, American Tragedy, he co-starred in HBO's Emmy-winning movie about the 2000 election, Recount, with Kevin Spacey, Tom Wilkinson, Ed Begley Jr., and Laura Dern.

In 2007, he produced Confessions of a Thug, a hip-hop musical film starring Daron Fordham, in which an educated street hustler re-examines his life. It won Best Direction from the San Diego Black Film Festival and was an official selection of the Urbanworld/Vibe Film Festival in New York. In 1992 Ray was a producer of Last Breeze of Summer, made at the American Film Institute, which garnered an Oscar nomination for Best Live Action Short. The Horrible Dr. Bones, from Forchion's original screenplay is available in stores now from Full Moon Releasing.

He is a recipient of the 1999 Team Player Award from the Black Hollywood Education Resource Center, a lifetime achievement for service to the film industry.

Personal life

Filmography

Television

Personal life
Forchion was born in Mount Holly Township, New Jersey, and raised in Moorestown Township, New Jersey. Later he moved to Miami, Florida, and currently resides in Los Angeles, California.

External links

American male film actors
American male television actors
Male actors from New Jersey
People from Moorestown, New Jersey
People from Mount Holly, New Jersey
Living people
Year of birth missing (living people)